Munkfors Municipality (Munkfors kommun) is a municipality in Värmland County in west central Sweden. Its seat is located in the town of Munkfors.

In 1952 the rural municipality Ransäter got the title of a market town (köping) and the name Munkfors after its only built-up locality. With the local government reform of 1971 it became a municipality of unitary type without addition of territory. The municipality is today the 9th smallest by population in Sweden.

In Ransäter lies the Geijer School, in honour of author Erik Gustaf Geijer (1783-1843), who was born at the Ransäter farm. A second notable Ransäter native was Tage Erlander (1901-1985), who was Prime Minister of Sweden 1946-1969.

The municipality has one sister city: Lindsborg, Kansas, U.S.A.

Elections

Riksdag
These are the local results of the Riksdag elections since the 1972 municipality reform. The results of the Sweden Democrats were not published by SCB between 1988 and 1998 at a municipal level to the party's small nationwide size at the time. "Votes" denotes valid votes, whereas "Turnout" denotes also blank and invalid votes.

Blocs

This lists the relative strength of the socialist and centre-right blocs since 1973, but parties not elected to the Riksdag are inserted as "other", including the Sweden Democrats results from 1988 to 2006, but also the Christian Democrats pre-1991 and the Greens in 1982, 1985 and 1991. The sources are identical to the table above. The coalition or government mandate marked in bold formed the government after the election. New Democracy got elected in 1991 but are still listed as "other" due to the short lifespan of the party. "Elected" is the total number of percentage points from the municipality that went to parties who were elected to the Riksdag.

References

External links

Munkfors Municipality - Official site

Municipalities of Värmland County